James Murray (1727 – 30 April 1799) was a landowner and politician from the Scottish Borders. He was a member of parliament (MP) from 1762 to 1774.

Early life and family 

Murray was the first-born son of Alexander Murray of Broughton and his wife Lady Euphemia Stewart, daughter of the 5th Earl of Galloway.
He was educated at the University of Glasgow, and then went on a grand tour.

On his father's death, Murray inherited extensive estates in Scotland and Ireland. They included Broughton House in Kirkcudbright, Killybegs in County Donegal, and Cally House near Gatehouse of Fleet, which Murray rebuilt to the designs of Robert Mylne.

In 1726 he had married his first cousin Lady Catherine Stewart,
daughter of his mother's brother the 6th Earl of Galloway.
They had only one child, Alicia, who fell ill and died while on a holiday in Rome.
However, Murray had already fathered an illegitimate daughter, Ann, born in 1725. Ann was raised at the Murray's Cally estate, with support of Lady Catherine.

In 1762, James and Catherine Murray met the writer James Boswell. In Boswell's words, James was a "most amiable man, [who] has very good sense, great knowledge of the world, and easy politeness of manners". He described Catherine as "very beautiful and, what is more, very agreeable, being possessed of the most engaging affability".

Career 

At the 1761 general election, Murray contested Wigtownshire on the interest of his relatives the Earls of Galloway, but lost by a small margin to John Hamilton of Bargany.
Murray lodged a petition, with the support of the Marquess of Rockingham, and a compromise was negotiated whereby Hamilton resigned and was found an alternative seat in Wigtown Burghs.

At the 1768 general election, the Earl of Stewart displaced Murray from the Wigtownshire seat in favour of his son Keith Stewart, who was Murray's brother-in-law and first cousin.
Murray was returned instead for Kirkcudbright Stewartry, but financial difficulties after the collapse of the Ayr Bank forced him to stand down in 1774. He voted regularly in Parliament, but did not speak in any debates.

From 1783 to 1784 Murray was the Receiver General of Land Tax for Scotland. From 1765 to 1773 he had been paid the salary for the job, without, actually doing it, and in 1766 he had turned down Rockingham's offer of formally taking the post.

He resigned as receiver in 1784, hoping to find another seat in Parliament, but the negotiations did not produce terms he could accept. Instead he eloped overseas with his mistress, whose child inherited his lands.

References 
 

1727 births
1799 deaths
People from the Scottish Borders
Members of the Parliament of Great Britain for Scottish constituencies
British MPs 1761–1768
British MPs 1768–1774
18th-century Scottish landowners